Les Invincibles is a comedy/drama television series from Radio-Canada produced by Casablanca Productions and Alliance Atlantis Vivafilm.

The story is about four men in their early thirties signing a pact ordaining the simultaneous break-up of their current relationships, and the subsequent adoption of a common responsibility-free life.

In 2006, the show won an "Olivier" for best drama series.

The third and last season ended on March 25, 2009.

A remake of the series was made in France. Filming began in Strasbourg in August 2008 and the show was broadcast on the Franco-German Arte network in Fall 2009.

Cast
 Pierre-François Legendre : Carlos Fréchette
 François Létourneau : Pierre-Antoine « P-A » Robitaille
 Patrice Robitaille : Steve Chouinard
 Rémi-Pierre Paquin : Rémi Durocher
 Catherine Trudeau : Lyne Boisvert
 Geneviève Néron : Kathleen Samson
 Lucie Laurier : Jolène
 Amélie Bernard : Vicky
 Germain Houde : Alain Robitaille
 Louise Bombardier : Gysèle
 Isabel Richer : Jeanne Langlois
 Donald Pilon : M. Boisvert
 Marie-Laurence Moreau : Manon
 Patrick Drolet : Richard
 Sylvain Marcel : Bernard
 Robin Aubert : Damien
 Kathleen Fortin : Cynthia
 Marilyse Bourke : Marie-Ange
 Mylène Saint-Sauveur : Mélanie

DVD releases
Alliance Home Entertainment has released all three seasons on DVD in Canada.

References

External links
 Official site
 

Television shows filmed in Quebec
2005 Canadian television series debuts
2009 Canadian television series endings
Ici Radio-Canada Télé original programming
Canadian mockumentary television series
2000s Canadian comedy-drama television series
2000s Canadian satirical television series
2000s Canadian LGBT-related comedy television series